Mercy Nnenda Chinwo is a Nigerian gospel musician, singer,  actress, comedian and songwriter.  She started singing at age 6 in her church's children's choir. In 2018 she released the hit single "Excess Love"

Early life & Education 
Mercy Nnenda Chinwo was born on September 5, 1991, in Rivers State.Mercy got her first school leaving certificate at the Goodwill international school and her secondary school education at Paradise international school She is an alumna of the International Business Management Institute (IBMI) where she bagged a degree in Human Resources Management.

Personal Life 
She got married on the 13th of  August 2022  in Port Harcourt to Pastor Blessed Uzochikwa and they both reside in Lagos, Nigeria.

Career and philanthropy 
Chinwo released her first single, "Testimony" in 2015, and "Igwe" . A year later  in 2017 she was signed to a Gospel Record Label. 

Mercy Chinwo is a Gospel music Minister. Since breaking into the gospel scene she has been featured on a number of gospel music projects, working with the likes of JJ Hairson,Nathaniel Bassey, Chioma Jesus, Banky W, Joe Praize, Samsong, Moses Bliss and a host of others. 

Asides music, Mercy Chinwo always gives expression to her other passions. They include: acting, a successful involvement in business with the launch of her beret and Merch company Mecempire; and most importantly humanitarian work. In 2023, she alongside her husband began the MercyisBlessed Foundation, an NGO with the aim of empowering lives,one soul at a time. Their work focuses on donations to the less privileged as well as youth development amongst others .

Achievements 
In 2018, Mercy Chinwo was awarded the Best Gospel Artiste at the CLIMAX Awards 2018. 
In 2019, at the maiden edition of the Africa Gospel Awards Festival (AGAFEST 2019) Mercy Chinwo was named winner in the categories Africa Gospel New Artiste of the Year, Africa Gospel Female Artiste of the Year, and Africa Gospel Song of the Year (Excess Love).
In 2020, Mercy Chinwo emerges as the Gospel Artiste of the year at the AFRIMMA Awards.
Africa Gospel Music of the year, CLIMA Africa Award 2022
Africa Gospel artist of the year, CLIMA Africa Award 2022

Discography

Albums 

 The Cross My Gaze (2018)
 Satisfied (2020)

Singles 

Testimony (2015)
Igwe (2016)
Excess Love (2018)
Omekanaya (2018)
No More Pain (2018)
 Chinedum (2018)
Power Belongs to Jesus (2019)
Äkamdinelu (2019)
Oh Jesus! (2019)
Obinasom (2020)
Kosi (2020)
Tasted Of Your Power (2020)
Na You Dey Reign(2020)
Yahweh (2021)
Yahweh (2022)
 Onememma (2020)
 Amazing God (2021)
 Bor ekom (2019)
 Incredible God (2018)

Filmography

See also
 List of Igbo people
 List of Nigerian gospel musicians
 List of Nigerian musicians

References

External links 

Singers from Port Harcourt
Nigerian gospel singers
Nigerian women singer-songwriters
Living people
21st-century Nigerian women singers
Ikwerre people
Actresses from Port Harcourt
1990 births